Also see: Outline of Kenya.
There are more than 14,000 articles related to Kenya.
Some articles (arranged alphabetically) related to Kenya include:



0-9 
 1428 Mombasa (a main-belt asteroid)
 1963 independence
 2002 Mombasa attacks
2008-09 Kenya Drought

A

B

C

E

F

G

H

I

J 
 Jumba la Mtwana

K

L

M

N

O

P

Q

R

S

T

U

V

W

X

Y 
 Yellow fever acacia

Z

See also

Lists of country-related topics - similar lists for other countries

 
Kenya